Vyachaslaw Yaraslawski (born 14 May 1985) is a Belarusian former professional footballer.

Honours
Sheriff Tiraspol
Moldovan National Division champion: 2003–04, 2004–05, 2005–06
Moldovan Cup winner: 2005–06
Moldovan Super Cup winner: 2003

Dinamo Brest
Belarusian Cup winner: 2006–07

External links

1985 births
Living people
Belarusian footballers
Association football midfielders
Belarusian expatriate footballers
Belarusian expatriate sportspeople in Moldova
Expatriate footballers in Moldova
FC Torpedo Minsk players
FC SKVICH Minsk players
FC Sheriff Tiraspol players
FC Dynamo Brest players
FC Neman Grodno players
FC Minsk players
FC Belshina Bobruisk players
FC Vitebsk players
FC Torpedo-BelAZ Zhodino players
FC Slavia Mozyr players
FC Gorodeya players
FC Lida players